William H. "Jinks" Fires (born July 23, 1940, in Rivervale, Arkansas) is an American Thoroughbred racehorse trainer. He is the trainer of 2011 Arkansas Derby winner Archarcharch which finished fifteenth in the Kentucky Derby.

Jinks Fires is a brother to U.S. Racing Hall of Fame jockey Earlie Fires.

References

1940 births
Living people
American horse trainers
People from Poinsett County, Arkansas